Justin Francis may refer to:
 Justin Francis (director)
 Justin Francis (entrepreneur)
 Justin Francis (American football)